Ro-15, originally named Submarine No. 24, was an Imperial Japanese Navy Kaichū-Type submarine of the Kaichū II subclass. She was commissioned in 1921 and operated in the waters of Japan. She was stricken in 1933.

Design and description
The submarines of the Kaichu II sub-class were larger and had a greater range than the preceding Kaichu I subclass, but they had the same powerplant, so their greater size resulted in a loss of some speed. They also had a modified conning tower, bow, and stern, and the stern was overhanging. They displaced  surfaced and  submerged.

For surface running, the submarines were powered by two  Sulzer Mark II diesel engines, each driving one propeller shaft. When submerged each propeller was driven by a  electric motor. They could reach  on the surface and  underwater.

The submarines were armed with six  torpedo tubes, four internal tubes in the bow and two external tubes mounted on the upper deck, and carried a total of ten Type 44 torpedoes. They were also armed with a single  deck gun mounted aft of the conning tower.

Construction and commissioning

Ro-15 was laid down as Submarine No. 24 on 12 June 1920 by the Kure Naval Arsenal at Kure, Japan. Launched on 14 October 1920, she was completed and commissioned on 30 June 1921.

Service history

Upon commissioning, Submarine No. 24 was attached to the Kure Naval District, to which she remained attached throughout her career. She was assigned to Submarine Division 15 — in which she spent the rest of her career — and to the Kure Defense Division on 1 July 1921. On 19 July 1921, a fire broke out in her galley due to faulty electrical wiring and spread to the adjacent torpedo room. She was flooded to extinguish it, but not before much of her interior was burned out. There were no casualties, and she was repaired and returned to service.

Submarine Division 15 served in the Kure Defense Division until 1 December 1921 and again from 1 December 1922 to 1 December 1923. While cruising off Moji, Japan, on 29 July 1924, Submarine No. 24 collided with a steamer, suffering no casualties.

Submarine No. 24 was renamed Ro-15 on 1 November 1924. On 1 December 1926, Submarine Division 15 began another assignment to the Kure Defense Division that lasted through the end of Ro-15′s active service.

Ro-15 was stricken from the Navy list on 1 September 1933. She remained moored at Kure as a hulk after that, and was renamed Training Hulk No. 3036 on 7 March 1934. She served on training duties through the end of World War II in August 1945, and was scrapped in September 1948.

Notes

References
, History of Pacific War Vol.17 I-Gō Submarines, Gakken (Japan), January 1998, 
Rekishi Gunzō, History of Pacific War Extra, "Perfect guide, The submarines of the Imperial Japanese Forces", Gakken (Japan), March 2005, 
The Maru Special, Japanese Naval Vessels No.43 Japanese Submarines III, Ushio Shobō (Japan), September 1980, Book code 68343-44
The Maru Special, Japanese Naval Vessels No.132 Japanese Submarines I "Revised edition", Ushio Shobō (Japan), February 1988, Book code 68344-36
The Maru Special, Japanese Naval Vessels No.133 Japanese Submarines II "Revised edition", Ushio Shobō (Japan), March 1988, Book code 68344-37
The Maru Special, Japanese Naval Vessels No.135 Japanese Submarines IV, Ushio Shobō (Japan), May 1988, Book code 68344-39

Ro-13-class submarines
Kaichū type submarines
Ships built by Kure Naval Arsenal
1920 ships
Ship fires
Japanese submarine accidents
Maritime incidents in 1921
Maritime incidents in 1924